Kajsa Bergh (born 1967) is a Swedish surrealist, one of the seven cofounders of the Surrealist Group in Stockholm in 1986.

Writing
 'Desire', Arsenal/Surrealist Subversion, No. 4 (1989). Reprinted in Penelope Rosemont, ed., Surrealist Women, 2000, p.456.

References

1967 births
Living people
Swedish surrealist artists
Women surrealist artists
Surrealist writers
Date of birth missing (living people)